Vitrea subrimata is a species of small, air-breathing land snail, a terrestrial pulmonate gastropod mollusk in the family Pristilomatidae.

Distribution 
The distribution of this species is alpine and southern-European.

This species occurs in countries and islands including:
 Czech Republic
 Ukraine
 Great Britain, notably the Great Asby Scar.

References

Pristilomatidae
Gastropods described in 1871